Konrad Abeltshauser (born 2 September 1992) is a German professional ice hockey defenceman for EHC München of the Deutsche Eishockey Liga (DEL). Abeltshauser was selected by the San Jose Sharks in the 6th round (163rd overall) of the 2010 NHL Entry Draft.

Playing career
Abeltshauser played four seasons (2009–2013) with the Halifax Mooseheads of the Quebec Major Junior Hockey League (QMJHL), where he registered 28 goals, 122 assists, and 127 penalty minutes, in 219 games played.

On 13 April 2012, the San Jose Sharks of the National Hockey League signed Abeltshauser to an entry-level contract, but he did not make his professional debut until the 2013–14 season when he played 57 games for San Jose's AHL affiliate, the Worcester Sharks.

On 29 June 2015, Abeltshauser was traded by the Sharks to the St. Louis Blues in exchange for a conditional draft pick. He was assigned by the Blues to begin the 2015–16 season with AHL affiliate, the Chicago Wolves. After providing just five assists in 20 games with the Wolves, on 16 January 2016, Abeltshauser was placed on unconditional waivers by the Blues in order to mutually terminate the remainder of his NHL contract. Upon clearing, he returned to his native Germany, signing a contract with Red Bull München of the Deutsche Eishockey Liga (DEL) on 20 January 2016. He received DEL Regular Season Defenceman of the Year honors in the 2016–17 campaign.

Career statistics

Regular season and playoffs

International

Awards and honours

References

External links
 

1992 births
Living people
Allen Americans players
Chicago Wolves players
German ice hockey defencemen
Halifax Mooseheads players
EHC München players
San Jose Sharks draft picks
Worcester Sharks players
People from Bad Tölz
Sportspeople from Upper Bavaria
Ice hockey players at the 2022 Winter Olympics
Olympic ice hockey players of Germany